Isabelle Laure Gatti de Gamond (28 July 1839 – 11 October 1905) was a Belgian educationalist, feminist, and politician.

Life 
Isabelle Gatti was the second of four daughters born to Giovanni Gatti, an Italian artist, and feminist writer Zoé de Gamond, of Brussels. Born in Paris, her family moved to Brussels when she was five, having lost their fortune in a failed phalanstère—a utopian community inspired by the writings of  utopian socialist Charles Fourier—at Cîteaux.

Her mother, an inspector of girl's schools, died in 1854, and the family's genteel poverty forced Isabelle to seek employment. She found this in Poland, working as a governess with a Polish noble family. It was at this time that she became an autodidact, teaching herself Ancient Greek, Latin, and philosophy.

She returned to Brussels in 1861, and continued her education by following public courses organised by the city government. Her ideas on education had already been formed, and in 1862 she launched the journal L'Education de la Femme (Women's Education) which championed the cause of schooling for girls.

In 1864, with the financial assistance of the city council, she launched the first systematic courses of secondary female education (Cours d'Éducation pour jeunes filles). Exceptionally for Belgium of the time, this venture was entirely independent of the Roman Catholic Church, and provided the very first organised secular education for women in Belgium.

The Catholic press opposed her work, but the school was a success. Among the teachers were Marie Popelin, Henriette Dachsbeck, and Anna-Augustine Amoré, mother of Marie Janson. Mayor of Brussels Charles Buls was a staunch supporter and assisted in the creation of an advanced, pre-university section in 1891.

Gatti retired from educational work in 1899 and entered politics as an activist for the Belgian Labour Party. Her support for universal adult suffrage did not meet with the support of the party's leadership, who expected women to vote for the Catholic Party.

Legacy 
In polls held by Belgian TV stations in 2005 to find the greatest Belgians, she was voted 55th in the De Grootste Belg, the Dutch-language series, and 88th in the Le plus grand Belge, the French-language programme.

She is buried in Uccle where the street where she lived bears her name.

References 
  Gubin, E., & Piette, V., "GATTI de GAMOND Isabelle, Laure (1839–1905)" in E. Gubin, C. Jacques, V. Piette & J. Puissant (eds), Dictionnaire des femmes belges: XIXe et XXe siècles. Bruxelles: Éditions Racine, 2006.

External links 
  Isabelle Gatti de Gamond, biography at the Centre d'Action Laïque.

1839 births
1905 deaths
Belgian feminists
Belgian suffragists
Politicians from Brussels
Belgian educators
Belgian educational theorists
Belgian women's rights activists
Belgian people of Italian descent
Belgian socialist feminists
19th-century Belgian educators
People from Uccle